The 2022 United States secretary of state elections were held on November 8, 2022, to elect the secretaries of state in twenty-seven states. These elections took place concurrently with several other federal, state, and local elections.

The elections for secretary of state had taken on heightened importance due to former President Donald Trump's baseless claims that the 2020 election was stolen. Many had argued that election officials such as secretaries of state could have the power to overturn the 2024 election, should its outcome be disagreeable to the losing candidate. As such, both parties are expending far more resources than in previous cycles on these races. A coalition of Republican candidates for secretary of state who have endorsed Trump's false claim that the 2020 election was stolen have organized under the America First Secretary of State Coalition slate.

The previous elections for this group of states took place in 2018. The secretary of state of Vermont serves two-year terms and was last elected in 2020. Additionally, there is a special election being held in Washington (secretary of state elections in Washington are regularly held in presidential election years) due to the resignation of Republican Kim Wyman to take a position in the administration of President Joe Biden.

Going into the election, there were 27 Republican secretaries of state and 20 Democratic secretaries of state. 13 Democratic secretaries of state are up for election, of whom Nellie Gorbea of Rhode Island is term-limited and Katie Hobbs of Arizona, Mark Kohler of Connecticut, Jesse White of Illinois, and Jim Condos of Vermont are retiring. 14 Republican secretaries of state are up for election, of whom John Merrill of Alabama and Barbara Cegavske of Nevada are term-limited, while Lawerence Denney of Idaho, Alvin Jaeger of North Dakota, and Karl Allred of Wyoming are retiring.

Republicans defended one state won by Joe Biden in 2020 (Georgia), while Democrats do not hold any states won by Donald Trump. However, Democrats defended several seats in states Biden won only narrowly, including Arizona, Wisconsin, and Michigan. Furthermore, Democrats had a net gain of one seat in Nevada, another state narrowly won by Biden.

Partisan composition 
Going into these elections, this class of secretaries of state is made up of 14 Republicans and 13 Democrats. Additionally, Democrats hold secretary of state offices in three states with Republican governors. By contrast, Republicans hold secretariat offices in two states with Democratic governors.

Election predictions 
Several sites and individuals published predictions of competitive seats. These predictions looked at factors such as the strength of the incumbent (if the incumbent is running for re-election), the strength of the candidates, and the partisan leanings of the state (reflected in part by the state's Cook Partisan Voting Index rating). The predictions assigned ratings to each seat, with the rating indicating the predicted advantage that a party has in winning that seat.

Most election predictors use:

 "tossup": no advantage
 "tilt" (used by some predictors): advantage that is not quite as strong as "lean"
 "lean": slight advantage
 "likely": significant, but surmountable, advantage
 "safe": near-certain chance of victory

Race summary

States

Closest races 
States where the margin of victory was under 1%:
 Wisconsin, 0.29%

States where the margin of victory was under 5%:
 Nevada, 2.28%
 Washington, 3.95%
 Arizona, 4.77%

States where the margin of victory was under 10%:
 Minnesota, 9.16%
 Georgia, 9.24%
 Illinois, 9.73%

Blue denotes races won by Democrats. Red denotes races won by Republicans.

Alabama

Incumbent Republican John Merrill was term-limited. Republican state representative Wes Allen, election administrator Ed Packard, Alabama State Auditor Jim Zeigler and activist Christian Horn ran for the seat. Corrections officer Pamela Laffitte was the only Democratic candidate in that party's primary.

Allen won his runoff on June 21, while Laffitte won her primary on May 24.

Allen won the general election.

Arizona

Incumbent Democrat Katie Hobbs retired to run for governor.

Democratic primary candidates included minority leader of the Arizona House of Representatives Reginald Bolding and former Maricopa County recorder Adrian Fontes.

Republican primary candidates included state representatives Shawnna Bolick and Mark Finchem, advertising executive Beau Lane, and state senator Michelle Ugenti-Rita.

Fontes and Finchem won their respective primaries on August 2.

Fontes won the general election.

Arkansas

Incumbent Republican John Thurston ran for re-election. Former state representative Eddie Joe Williams unsuccessfully challenged Thurston in the Republican primary.

Democratic primary candidates included executive director of the Women's Foundation of Arkansas Anna Beth Gorman and former Pulaski County election commissioner Josh Price.

Thurston and Gorman won their respective primaries on May 24.

Thurston won re-election.

California

Incumbent Democrat Shirley Weber is ran for election to a full term.

Republican primary candidates included chief financial officer Rob Bernosky, author Rachel Hamm, Teamster truck driver James "J. W." Paine, and retired warehouseman Raul Rodriguez Jr.

Teacher Gary B. Blenner ran as the Green Party candidate, while private investigator Matthew D. Cinquanta ran as an independent.

Weber and Bernosky advanced from the nonpartisan blanket primary on June 7.

Weber won re-election.

Colorado

Incumbent Democrat Jena Griswold ran for re-election.

Republican primary candidates included former Jefferson County clerk Pam Anderson, former head of the nonprofit Colorado Lending Source Mike O'Donnell, and Mesa County clerk Tina Peters. Walter James Rutledge is ran as a Libertarian.

Griswold and Anderson won their respective primaries on June 28.

Griswold won re-election.

Connecticut

Incumbent Democrat Mark Kohler retired, having been appointed to the position after Denise Merrill resigned early. Democratic primary candidates included New Haven health director Maritza Bond and state representative Stephanie Thomas.

Republican primary candidates included Apple senior account manager Dominic Rapini, New Britain executive mayoral aide Brock Weber, and state representative Terrie Wood.

Environmental attorney Cynthia Jennings ran on the Independent Party of Connecticut ticket. Harold Harris ran as a Libertarian, while Douglas Lary ran as the Green Party candidate.

Thomas and Rapini won their respective primaries on August 9.

Thomas won the election.

Georgia

Incumbent Republican Brad Raffensperger ran for re-election. Other Republican candidates included U.S. Representative for Georgia's 10th congressional district Jody Hice, former Treutlen County probate judge T. J. Hudson, and former Alpharetta mayor David Belle Isle.

Democratic primary candidates included former state representative Dee Dawkins-Haigler, former Fulton County chairman John Eaves, former Milledgeville mayor Floyd Griffin, state representative Bee Nguyen, and former chair of the Cobb County Democratic party Michael Owens.

Ted Metz ran as a Libertarian.

Raffensperger won his primary on May 24, while Nguyen won her runoff on June 21.

Raffensperger won re-election in the general election.

Idaho

Incumbent Republican Lawerence Denney retired. Republican primary candidates included Ada County clerk Phil McGrane, state representative Dorothy Moon, and state senator Mary Souza.

Shawn Keenan was the only Democratic candidate.

McGrane and Keenan won their respective primaries on May 17.

McGrane won the general election.

Illinois

Incumbent Democrat Jesse White retired.

Democratic candidates included former Illinois state treasurer Alexi Giannoulias, Chicago alderman David Moore, Cook County resident Sidney Moore, and city clerk of Chicago Anna Valencia.

Republican candidates included deputy minority leader of the Illinois House of Representatives Dan Brady, former United States Attorney for the Central District of Illinois John C. Milhiser, and former Chicago police sergeant Michelle Turney.

Giannoulias and Brady won their respective primaries on June 28.

Giannoulias won the election.

Indiana

Incumbent Republican Holli Sullivan was appointed by governor Eric Holcomb after the previous secretary, Connie Lawson, resigned. Sullivan ran for a full term. Other Republican candidates included Newton County commissioner Kyle Conrad, perennial candidate Paul Hager, and former aide to governor Mike Pence and candidate for Indiana's 4th congressional district in 2018 Diego Morales.

The only Democratic candidate is former deputy attorney general Destiny Scott Wells.

Jeff Maurer ran as a Libertarian.

Morales won the nomination at the Republican state convention on June 18. He also won the general election.

Iowa

Incumbent Republican Paul Pate ran for re-election.

Democratic primary candidates included Linn County auditor Joel Miller and Clinton County auditor Eric Van Lancker.

Pate and Miller won their respective primaries on June 7.

Pate won re-election.

Kansas

Incumbent Republican Scott Schwab ran for re-election. He faced an unsuccessful primary challenge from Michael Brown, former member of the Johnson County Commission.

The only Democratic candidate was former director of urban outreach for the United Methodist Church of the Resurrection Jeanna Repass.

Schwab won re-election in the general election.

Massachusetts

Incumbent Democrat William F. Galvin ran for re-election. Tanisha Sullivan, president of the Boston chapter of the NAACP, challenged Galvin in the Democratic primary.

The only Republican candidate was former dental assistant and insurance claims manager Rayla Campbell.

Galvin won re-election.

Michigan

Incumbent Democrat Jocelyn Benson ran for re-election.

Republican primary candidates included Chesterfield Township clerk Cindy Berry, Republican activist Kristina Karamo, state representative Beau LaFave and Plainfield Township clerk Cathleen Postmus.

Karamo won the August 2 Republican primary.

Benson won re-election.

Minnesota

Incumbent Democrat Steve Simon ran for re-election. He faced an unsuccessful primary challenge from Steve Carlson.

Republican primary candidates included Kim Crockett, former vice president of the conservative think tank Center of the American Experiment, and author Erik van Mechelen.

Crockett won her primary on August 9.

Simon won re-election.

Nebraska

Incumbent Republican Bob Evnen ran for re-election. Former Palmyra fire chief Rex Schroder and Robert J. Borer challenged him in the Republican primary.

Evnen won his primary on May 10. He won re-election.

Nevada

Incumbent Republican Barbara Cegavske was term-limited and cannot seek a third term.

Republican candidates included Sparks city councilman Kristopher Dahir, entrepreneur John Cardiff Gerhardt, former state senator Jesse Haw, businesswoman Socorro Kennan, former member of the Nevada Assembly Jim Marchant, former news anchor Gerard Ramalho, and former Nevada 8th judicial district court judge Richard Scotti.

The only Democratic primary candidate was former Harry Reid staffer Cisco Aguilar. Janine Hansen is running as the candidate of the Independent American Party, while Ross Crane is running as a Libertarian.

Marchant and Aguilar won their respective primaries on June 14.

Aguilar narrowly won the general election.

New Mexico

Incumbent Democrat Maggie Toulouse Oliver ran for re-election. Republican rancher Audrey Trujillo challenged Oliver. Libertarian candidate Mayna Erika Myers was also running.

Oliver and Trujillo won their respective primaries on June 7.

Oliver won re-election.

North Dakota

Incumbent Republican Alvin Jaeger retired. State representative Michael Howe and businessman Marvin Lepp ran in the Republican primary.

The only Democratic primary candidate was Mayville State University administrator Jeffrey Powell.

Howe and Powell won their respective primaries on June 14.

Howe won the general election.

Ohio

Incumbent Republican Frank LaRose ran for re-election. Former member of the Ohio House of Representatives John Adams unsuccessfully challenged him for the Republican nomination.

The only Democratic candidate was Forest Park councilmember Chelsea Clark.

Podcaster Terpsehore Tore Maras, also known as Terpsichore "Tore" Maras-Lindeman, initially challenged LaRose in the primary, but was disqualified. She is now running as an Independent.

LaRose and Clark won their respective primaries on May 3.

LaRose easily won re-election.

Rhode Island

Incumbent Democrat Nellie Gorbea was term-limited and couldn't seek a third term. Democratic candidates included state representative Gregg Amore, Stephanie Beaute, and tax preparer Anthony Tamba.

The only Republican candidate was perennial candidate Pat Cortellessa.

Cannabis activist Anne Armstrong ran as an independent.

Amore won the election.

South Carolina

Incumbent Republican Mark Hammond ran for re-election. He faced an unsuccessful primary challenge from businessman Keith Blandford.

The only Democratic primary candidate was Rosemounda Peggy Butler.

Hammond and Butler won their respective primaries on June 14.

Hammond won re-election.

South Dakota

Incumbent Republican Steve Barnett ran for re-election. He faced a successful primary challenge from secretary of state office worker Monae Johnson, who won the nomination at the Republican state convention on June 25.

Thomas Cool was the Democratic nominee.

Barnett won re-election.

Vermont

Incumbent Democrat Jim Condos retired. Democratic candidates included state representative Sarah Copeland-Hanzas, Montpelier city clerk John Odum, and Deputy Secretary of State Chris Winters. Copeland-Hanzas won the August 9 primary. The only Republican candidate was perennial candidate H. Brooke Paige. Robert Millar ran as the candidate of the Vermont Progressive Party.

Sarah won the general election.

Washington (special)

Incumbent Democrat Steve Hobbs was appointed November 22, 2021, after his predecessor, Kim Wyman, resigned. He is running in the special election. He faced an intraparty primary challenge from Marquez Tiggs.

Republican candidates included conspiracy theorist Tamborine Borrelli, Bob Hagglund, former state senator Mark Miloscia, and state senator Keith Wagoner.

Kurtis Engle ran as the candidate of the Union Party, while Pierce County auditor Julie Anderson ran as a nonpartisan.

Hobbs and Anderson advanced from the all-party primary to the general election on August 2.

State representative Brad Klippert, formerly a candidate for congress, ran a write-in campaign.

Hobbs narrowly won the general election.

Wisconsin

Incumbent Democrat Doug La Follette ran for re-election. Dane County Democratic party chair Alexia Sabor challenged him in the Democratic primary.

Republican candidates included assemblywoman Amy Loudenbeck, former firefighter Daniel Schmidtka, and businessman Jay Schroeder.

Neil Harmon ran as a Libertarian, while Sharyl McFarland ran as an independent.

La Follette and Loudenbeck won their respective primaries on August 9.

La Follettee barley won re-election.

Wyoming

Incumbent Republican Edward Buchanan did not seek re-election and resigned before the end of his term. Governor Mark Gordon appointed Karl Allred to serve as interim secretary. Allred is not on the general election ballot.

Republican primary candidates included geologist Mark Armstrong, state representative Chuck Gray, and state senator Tara Nethercott.

Gray won the primary on August 16. He also won the general election.

Notes

References